This is a list of historic places in Southwestern Ontario, containing heritage sites listed on the Canadian Register of Historic Places (CRHP), all of which are designated as historic places either locally, provincially, territorially, nationally, or by more than one level of government.

The following subregions have separate listings:
County of Brant
Essex County
Middlesex County
Perth County
Regional Municipality of Waterloo
Wellington County

List of historic places in other subregions

Bruce County

Chatham-Kent

Elgin County

Grey County

Haldimand County

Huron County

Lambton County

Norfolk County

Oxford County

See also

List of historic places in Ontario
List of National Historic Sites of Canada in Ontario

References

Southwestern Ontario